Ranishwar is a village in the Ranishwar CD block in the Dumka Sadar subdivision of the Dumka district in the Indian state of Jharkhand.

Etymology
The village has an old  temple dedicated to Hindu God Shiva also known as "Ranishwar Nath" from which the village derives its name.

Geography

Location

In the map of Ranishwar CD block in the District Census Handbook, Dumka, Ranishwar is shown as being part of Amrapara mouza (MDDS PLCN - 371187).

Overview
The map shows a large area, which is a plateau with low hills, except in the eastern portion where the Rajmahal hills intrude into this area and the Ramgarh hills are there. The south-western portion is just a rolling upland. The entire area is overwhelmingly rural with only small pockets of urbanisation.

Note: The full screen map is interesting. All places marked on the map are linked in the full screen map and one can easily move on to another page of his/her choice. Enlarge the full screen map to see what else is there – one gets railway connections, many more road connections and so on.

Area

Demographics
According to the 2011 Census of India, Amrapara had a total population of 91, of which 45  (49%) were males and 46 (51%) were females. Population in the age range 0–6 years was 16. The total number of literate persons in Amrapara was 75 (61.33% of the population over 6 years).

Civic administration

Police station
There is a police station at Ranishwar.

CD block HQ
Headquarters of Ranishwar CD block is at Ranishwar village.

Transport
Ranishwar is connected with road to the neighboring city. Since July 2011 Dumka is connected with newly built Jasidih - Dumka railway line. Since then Ranishwar got a new connectivity to the Howrah-New Delhi line, via Dumka-Jasidih. Although there is an ongoing work on new railway line, which will connect Dumka to Bhagalpur (Bihar) and Rampurhat (west Bangal) in coming years.

But Buses are the preferred mode of transport and are run by both government agencies and private operators. Dumka has good connectivity to it neighboring district with buses. There is luxury night bus service between Dumka - Ranchi and Kolkata.
The following are Railway stations close to Ranishwar
Siuri Railway Station  located at a distance of       
Chinpal Railway Station located at a distance of  
Gadadharpur Railway Station located at a distance of  
Sainthia Railway Station  located at a distance of  
Dumka Railway Station  located at a distance of

Education
Mayurakshi Gramin College, affiliated with Sido Kanhu Murmu University, was established at Ranishwar.

Ranishwar has some CBSE schools, and government schools following NCERT syllabus. A list of schools in and around Ranishwar are:
 
Ranigram Middle School established  in the year 1901, is one of the oldest school in Dumka district. the headmistress of this school Mrs Bharati Chatterjee.
Raghunathpur Govt. High School 
UPG Middle School Rangalia 
Govt. Middle School Kumirdaha  follows NCERT syllabus
Sadipur Govt. Middle School 
Govt. Middle School Dhanbasa follows NCERT syllabus
Sido Kanhu High school Affiliated to CBSE board, New Delhi
'"M G College"' Mayurakshi Gramin College, Ranishwar
'"Girls School Ranishwar

References

Villages in Dumka district